Anjana Basu is a Bengali Indian actress and BJP politician based in Kolkata. She started her acting career with modelling, and gradually with a serial "Robir Aloy" which aired on Alpha Bangla (presently known as Zee Bangla), she came into the limelight. The year was 2003. In 2005, she was a part of a horror film, Raat Barota Panch, after which she didn't have to look back. 

She has appeared in Aniket Chattopadhyay's Chha-e Chhuti and Bye Bye Bangkok. She has also worked in television mega-serials like Gaaner Oparey, Shonar Horin, Debdas, Bidhir Bidhan, Bodhuboron etc. Anjana has worked with Amol Palekar in Krishnakali.

Early life
Anjana spent her childhood in Howrah in West Bengal. She was a good student, and had active interest in writing and recitation. She lived in a joint family. Her father didn't want her to come into theater or acting, and thus she concentrated in her studies. She learned Bharatnatyam in her childhood . Her father was a member of an amateur theater group. She studied in Howrah Girls' School and Bijoy Krishna Girls' College, and pursued with Psychology. After completing her studies in Howrah she came to Kolkata and entered the Rajabazar Science College, University of Calcutta for post graduation, but could not complete her studies. She got married and moved to Patna. Later she came back to Kolkata and since then, took acting as her career.

Career
She rose to fame with the Hindi serial Krishnakali, which was directed by Amol Palekar, based on a story by Shivani. She played an important character in Amol Palekar's film Dum kata. In 2007 or 2008, she starred in a Telefilm Parokiya, directed by Atanu Ghosh. This telefilm aired on Tara Muzik was based on adultery. It also featured Kaushik Sen, Debolina Dutta, Kushal Chakraborty. Then, she had starred in various tele films like Jhumuria, Tutul, Room No.103, and Bye bye Bangkok.

Filmography
Raat Barota Panch (2005) 
Dum Kata (2007)
Jara Bristite Bhijechhilo (2007)
Angshumaner Chhobi (2009)
Eka Eka (2009)
Durga (2009) (Unreleased)
Chha-e Chhuti (2009)
Ghar Sansar  (2010)
Bye Bye Bangkok    (2011)
Laptop
Room No. 103  (2015) 
Adbhut (2013)
Byomkesh Phire Elo (2014)
 Durbin (2014) 
Abar Boshonto (2014) (unreleased) 
Pakaram (2015) 
 Abhimaan
 Dwikhondito
Ragini
 Kishmish (2022)
 Aparajito (2022)

Television
Mega Serials
Robir Aloy (2003) aired on Zee Bangla
Gaaner Oparey (2010–2011), aired on Star Jalsha
Alpona, aired on Mahuaa Bangla
Krishnakali, aired on DD National
Bhalobasha.com aired on Star Jalsha
Durgeshnandinii aired on Colors Bangla
Bhasha aired on Star Jalsha
Prabahini Ei Shomoy aired on Akash Aath
Ashambhab aired on Zee Bangla
 Jagaran  aired on DD Bangla
 Ghorer Bhitor Jhor aired on Colors Bangla
Bidhir Bidhan, aired on Star Jalsha
Bodhuboron, aired on Star Jalsha
Bijoyinee, aired on Star Jalsha
Mon Mane Na, aired on Colors Bangla
Pilu, aired on Zee Bangla
Telefilms
Parokiya (2000) (directed by Atanu Ghosh), aired on Tara Muzik
Jhumuria (2008) (directed by Abhijit Dasgupta) aired on Tara Muzik
Dadi
Dark room
Tutul aired on Tara Muzik
Bhuturiar Bhutera
Lobon Joler shira
Shopno Shishu
Je Jekhane Darie aired on Tara Muzik
Fire dekha
Akmutho kash ful aired on Akash Aath
Dinante
Odbhoot Noksha aired on Tara Muzik

References

External links

Actresses in Bengali cinema
Bengali television actresses
People from Howrah
University of Calcutta alumni
Living people
Year of birth missing (living people)
20th-century Indian actresses
21st-century Indian actresses
Bharatiya Janata Party politicians from West Bengal